Ronald Cockerill (28 February 1935 – 4 November 2010) was a professional footballer, born in Sheffield, who played in the Football League as a defender for Huddersfield Town and Grimsby Town.

His sons Glenn and John were also professional footballers.

Cockerill died on 3 November 2010.

References

1935 births
2010 deaths
Footballers from Sheffield
English footballers
Association football defenders
Huddersfield Town A.F.C. players
Grimsby Town F.C. players
English Football League players